I'm So Sorry is a 2015 promotional single by Imagine Dragons

I'm So Sorry may also refer to:
"I'm So Sorry", single by Carroll Thompson 1981, No.1 UK Reggae Chart
"I'm So Sorry", single by	José (Dutch singer),	P. Souer 1981  
"I'm So Sorry", single by	Billy Lamont, Lamont	1957
"I'm So Sorry", single by	EC2 (band),	E. Milburne, C. Westerlund, Mick Ronson 1990
"I'm So Sorry", song by	Hazel O'Connor, H. O'Connor	1984
"I'm So Sorry", song by	Herreys, Per Herrey	1985
"I'm So Sorry", song by Mary Wells, written Berry Gordy, Earl Brooks, from Bye Bye Baby I Don't Want to Take a Chance	1961
"I'm So Sorry", song by folk group The Silkie	1966
"I'm So Sorry", an unreleased song from the score of the 2005 motion picture Star Wars: Episode III - Revenge of the Sith
"So. Central Rain (I'm Sorry)",	R.E.M. 1984
"I'm So Sorry", song from the album The Best of Patricia Majalisa
I'm So Sorry Baby